In Etruscan mythology, Tyrrhenus (in ) was one of the founders of the Etruscan League of twelve cities, along with his brother Tarchon. Herodotus describes him as the saviour of the Etruscans, because he led them from Lydia to Etruria; however this Lydian origin is to be debated as it contradicts cultural and linguistic evidence, as well as the view held by both the Etruscans themselves and by other Etrusco-Roman and Greek ancient sources. His name was given to the Etruscan people by the Greeks. The Romans extended this use to the sea west of Etruria: the Tyrrhenian Sea.

References

Mythological archetypes
Etruscan mythology